The surname Friz derives from Fritz, diminutive of the German name Friederich (Frederick), originating from the Old Germanic Frithurik, composed of the prefix frithu ("peace", "friendship": Friede, in German) and the suffix rikia ("lord", "prince"), meaning "Lord of Peace", "The One who assures peace".

The surname is diffused in the Adige Valley in northern Italy. It's a German surname which established originally in the Region of Trentino on the comune di Garniga (town of Garniga)."

"Der Alte Fritz" refers specifically to Frederick the Great.

List of people with the name
Surname
Anna Friz (born 1970), Canadian artist
Clyde Nelson Friz (1867–1942), American architect 
Max Friz (1883–1966), German engineer 
Peter Friz (born 1974), German mathematician

Given name
Friz Freleng (1906–1995), American animator

References
 Source: "Saggio di Commento ai Cognomi Tridentini", by Ernesto Lorenzo, 1895.
 Rafael Scapin's Genealogy Page

Surnames